Kyzh is a rural locality (a settlement) in Dobryansky District, Perm Krai, Russia. The population was 129 in 2010. There are nine streets.

Geography 
Kyzh is located 46 km northeast of Dobryanka (the district's administrative centre) by road. Kukhtym is the nearest rural locality.

References 

Rural localities in Dobryansky District